Bubble Dizzy is an arcade style action video game developed by the Oliver Twins and published in November 1990 by Codemasters for the Amstrad, Spectrum, MS-DOS, Atari ST, Commodore 64 and Amiga.

Gameplay
The game involves Dizzy being forced to walk the plank of a pirate ship and from the sea bed use bubbles to float back to the surface and dry land. Like Dizzy Down the Rapids, this game derived from a mini-game found in The Fantastic Adventures of Dizzy.

External links 

1990 video games
Amiga games
Amstrad CPC games
Atari ST games
Codemasters games
Commodore 64 games
Dizzy (series)
DOS games
Video games scored by Matthew Simmonds
ZX Spectrum games
Video games developed in the United Kingdom